Am I Dead Yet may refer to:

Books
Am I Dead Yet: A Journalist's Perspective on Terror, a book by John Scully

Music
"Am I Dead Yet?", a song on the 2018 album Deportation Blues
"Am I Dead Yet?", a song on the 1993 album Life in the Dirty District
Am I Dead Yet, a band formed by Mary Byker and Noko